McLean County is a county located in the U.S. state of Kentucky. As of the 2020 census, the population was 9,152. Its  county seat is Calhoun and its largest city is Livermore. McLean is a prohibition or dry county. McLean County is part of the Owensboro, KY Metropolitan Statistical Area, which has a population of some 114,752 (2010 census).

History 

McLean County was formed by act of the Kentucky legislature on February 6, 1854, from portions of surrounding Daviess, Ohio, and Muhlenberg Counties. The county was named for Judge Alney McLean, founder of Greenville, the county seat of Muhlenberg County.

Geography 

Features

McLean County is part of the Western Coal Fields region of Kentucky.

The county is transected southeast to northwest by Green River, the longest river entirely within the Commonwealth of Kentucky.  Bridge crossings of Green River are at Calhoun, Livermore, east of Island, and west of Beech Grove.  Green River is navigable throughout McLean County, with Army Corps of Engineers Lock and Dam #2 at Calhoun assisting boat navigation.

Adjacent counties
 Henderson County  (northwest)
 Daviess County  (northeast)
 Ohio County  (east)
 Muhlenberg County  (south)
 Hopkins County  (southwest)
 Webster County  (west)

Demographics 

As of the census of 2000, there were 9,938 people, 3,984 households, and 2,880 families residing in the county. The racial makeup of the county was 98.58% White, 0.36% Black or African American, 0.16% Native American, 0.04% Asian, 0.01% Pacific Islander, 0.31% from other races, and 0.53% from two or more races.  0.84% of the population were Hispanic or Latino of any race.

There were 3,984 households, out of which 32.30% had children under the age of 18 living with them, 60.00% were married couples living together, 8.70% had a female householder with no husband present, and 27.70% were non-families. 24.70% of all households were made up of individuals, and 11.40% had someone living alone who was 65 years of age or older.  The average household size was 2.47 and the average family size was 2.93.

In the county, the population was spread out, with 24.20% under the age of 18, 8.30% from 18 to 24, 27.70% from 25 to 44, 25.40% from 45 to 64, and 14.50% who were 65 years of age or older.  The median age was 38 years. For every 100 females, there were 96.40 males.  For every 100 females age 18 and over, there were 93.20 males.

The median income for a household in the county was $29,675, and the median income for a family was $35,322. Males had a median income of $28,446 versus $19,432 for females. The per capita income for the county was $16,046.  About 13.70% of families and 16.00% of the population were below the poverty line, including 21.10% of those under age 18 and 18.50% of those age 65 or over.

Education 

McLean County has a county-wide public school district of some 1,300 students with one high school, one middle school and three elementary schools.

McLean County High School has approximately 400 students.  Its first graduating class was 1973.  McLean County Middle School has roughly 350 students. In the 2006–2007 school year, McLean County Middle School ranked third in final year testing and second in public schools to Hancock County.  Both schools are located just east of Calhoun on Highway 136 and have the cougar as mascots.

Additionally, the county school system has three grade K-5 elementary schools in the towns of Calhoun, Livermore and Sacramento.  Elementary schools in the towns of Beech Grove and Island were closed years ago.  The Calhoun and Livermore elementaries have about 250 and 200 students respectively, while Sacramento Elementary has around 100 students.  Calhoun Elementary School's mascot is the bulldog, Livermore Elementary School's mascot is the yellow jacket, Sacramento Elementary School's mascot is the blue jay, Island Elementary School's mascot was the eagle, and Beech Grove Elementary School's mascot was the gorilla.  Sacramento's future was at stake at one time, but the school was renamed as Marie Gatton Phillips Elementary School and remains active.

At any time, between 350 and 400 county residents are enrolled in higher education of some form.

Media
McLean County is served by a weekly newspaper, the McLean County News.

In terms of radio and television, McLean County is part of the Owensboro, Kentucky radio market and the Evansville, Indiana television market. Spectrum Cable, a unit of Charter Communications, is the county's cable television provider.

Communities

Cities
 Calhoun, population 837, sits on the north bank of Green River in the central area of the county and is the seat of government.
 Island is noted for its annual Wooden Bridge Festival and has a population of 435.
 Livermore, the largest community in McLean County with a population 1,482, lies in the eastern part of the county at the scenic confluence of Rough and Green Rivers.  Livermore's bridge is noteworthy, as it begins in McLean County, crosses the Rough River, passes over and has a pylon on a sliver of Ohio County territory, crosses the Green River, then ends back in McLean County.
 Sacramento is home to the annual Battle of Sacramento Civil War Reenactment, the largest tourist event in the county, and has a population of 517.

Census-designated place
 Beech Grove

Other unincorporated communities

North McLean

 Buel
 Cleopatra
 Comer
 Congleton
 Elba
 Glenville
 Guffie
 Lemon
 Livia (partially in Daviess County)
 Nuckols
 Poverty
 Rangers Landing
 Wrightsburg
 Wyman

South McLean

 Buttonsberry
 Poplar Grove
 Rumsey
 Semiway
 Station
 Underwood

Politics

See also

 National Register of Historic Places listings in McLean County, Kentucky

References

 
Kentucky counties
Populated places established in 1854
Owensboro metropolitan area
1854 establishments in Kentucky